Gevani McCoy  is an American football quarterback who currently plays for the Idaho Vandals.

Early life and high school
McCoy grew up in Baldwin Hills, California and initially attended Lakewood High School. He passed for 830 yards and seven touchdowns as a sophomore. McCoy passed for 1,569 yards and 14 touchdowns and rushed 117 times for 721 yards and 12 touchdowns during his junior season. He transferred to Lawndale High School before the start of his senior year. McCoy committed to play college football at Idaho, which was his only scholarship offer, during his junior year of high school.

College career
McCoy played in three games as a true freshman at Idaho before redshirting the season, completing 15 of 32 pass attempts for 205 yards and one touchdown. He was named the Vandals' starting quarterback going into his redshirt freshman season. New head coach Jason Eck had initially considered moving McCoy to cornerback during offseason practices before deciding to keep him at quarterback. McCoy completed 204 of 298 passes for 2,719 yards with 27 touchdown passes and seven interceptions and also rushed for three touchdowns. He was named the Big Sky Conference Freshman of the Year, third-team All-Big Sky, and won the Jerry Rice Award as the most outstanding freshman in the NCAA Division I Football Championship Subdivision.

Statistics

References

External links
Idaho Vandals profile

Living people
Players of American football from California
American football quarterbacks
Idaho Vandals football players
Year of birth missing (living people)